Erich Schriever (6 August 1924 – 29 April 2020) was a Swiss rower who competed in the 1948 Summer Olympics. In 1948 he was a crew member of the Swiss boat which won the silver medal in the coxed four event.

References

1924 births
2020 deaths
Swiss male rowers
Olympic rowers of Switzerland
Rowers at the 1948 Summer Olympics
Olympic silver medalists for Switzerland
Olympic medalists in rowing
Medalists at the 1948 Summer Olympics
European Rowing Championships medalists